Jachacunocollo (possibly from Aymara jach'a big, khunu snow, qullu mountain), also known as Jacha Cuno Collo, Tres Marias, Don Luis or Jacha Collo is a mountain in the Andes in Bolivia. It is the highest elevation in the Quimsa Cruz Range reaching an elevation of about 5,800 metres (19,029 ft). Jachacunocollo is situated in the La Paz Department, Inquisivi Province, Quime Municipality, north-west of Wayna Khunu Qullu, the second highest mountain in this mountain range.

See also
 Wallatani Lake
List of mountains in the Andes

References 

Mountains of La Paz Department (Bolivia)